Cristiana "Chicca" Pellino (21 September 1970 - 23 February 2018) was an Italian racewalker.

Biography
After her career as an athlete she became a coach, coaching Marco De Luca among others. She dead in 2018 at 47.

National titles
Pellino won three titles in a row at the national championships at individual senior level.
 Italian Athletics Indoor Championships
 3000 m walk: 1999, 2000, 2001

See also
 Italian team at the running events
 Italy at the European Race Walking Cup
 Italy at the Military World Games

References

External links
 

1970 births
2018 deaths
Italian female racewalkers
Athletes from Rome
Italian athletics coaches
Athletics competitors of Gruppo Sportivo Forestale